Dera Allah Yar is a city and the headquarters of the Jaffarabad District located in Balochistan, Pakistan. It is situated at the distance of 300 km from provincial capital Quetta.

The city formerly was known as Jhatpat.

The city was named after the assassination of their Political Leader Mir Allahyar Khan Khosa.

Etymology
The word Dera means abode or settlement in Balochi, Pashto, Urdu, and Punjabi languages. Dera Allah Yar thus means the settlement or city of Allah Yar. Some other cities also have Dera as a pre-fix such as  Dera Bugti, Dera Ismail Khan, and Dera Ghazi Khan.

Incidents
On 27 August 2008 at least 25 people belonging to the Jamhoori Wattan Party (JWP-Aali) suffered injuries when a bomb exploded in a public meeting. The bomb had been placed on a motorcycle, the activists had gathered for a meeting on the second anniversary of the death of Akbar Bugti.

References

Populated places in Jafarabad District